The 1999 Nigerian Senate election in Jigawa State was held on February 20, 1999, to elect members of the Nigerian Senate to represent Jigawa State. Bello Maitama Yusuf representing Jigawa Central and Ibrahim Muhammed Kirikasama representing Jigawa East won on the platform of All Nigeria Peoples Party, while Mohammed Alkali representing Jigawa North West won on the platform of the Peoples Democratic Party.

Overview

Summary

Results

Jigawa Central 
The election was won by Bello Maitama Yusuf of the All Nigeria Peoples Party.

Jigawa East 
The election was won by Ibrahim Muhammed Kirikasama of the All Nigeria Peoples Party.

Jigawa North West 
The election was won by Mohammed Alkali of the Peoples Democratic Party.

References 

Jig
Jig
Jigawa State Senate elections